Cheikh Hamidou Kane, nicknamed "Mathaira," (18 December 1939 - 15 May 2009) was a Senegalese politician and economist who served as a government minister several times during Abdou Diouf's presidency. He was a member of the Socialist Party (PS) and later of the Alliance of the Forces of Progress (AFP).

Biography 
Of Futa origin, Cheikh Hamidou Kane initially undertook studies at Matam, where his father was Chief Financial Officer and paymaster for the cercle of Matam. In 1945, Kane began his Qur'anic studies which he completed with success six years later in 1951. It was as a result of these studies that he received the nickname Mathiara talibe Almoudo. In the same year he enrolled at the École normale supérieure William Ponty, from which he was expelled in 1959 as a result of a strike. He then travelled to France for the first time, visiting the Ministry of Economy and Finance and the prefecture of Poitiers before returning to Senegal.

In Senegal he held several high government positions in succession, mainly in the Ministry of Economy and Finance. In 1981, he was named Director of Debt and Investments in the Ministry of Economy and Finance, then Director of Economic Control and Director of Internal Trade, and finally Director of External Trade. Subsequently, from 1984 to 1990, he was Director of the Senegalese Company of Insurance and Re-Insurance (CSAR), which would become AXA Insurance.

In March 1990, he was named Ministerial Delegate at the Presidency for African Economic Integration. Further ministerial responsibilities were then conferred on him: he was Ministerial Delegate for Rural Development and Water from April 1991 to June 1993, then Minister of Commerce and Industry from June 1993 to March 1995. On 15 March 1995, he was appointed Minister of the Armed Forces in Habib Thiam's third cabinet. He retained this position in Mamadou Lamine Loum's cabinet. He lost his ministerial role in 2000, after Abdoulaye Wade and the Senegalese Democratic Party (PDS) came to power.

Long a member of the Socialist Party, he joined the Alliance of the Forces of Progress (AFP) of Moustapha Niasse (whom he had known in university) and was made part of the AFP's political bureau and regional co-ordinator for Matam.

Between 2001 and 2007 he was an AFP deputy in the National Assembly.

He was involved in the campaigns for the local elections in 2009, but after several months of illness he travelled to France to receive treatment and then returned to Senegal. He died in Dakar on 15 May 2009 and was buried in the Muslim cemetery at Yoff.

References

Bibliography 
 Babacar Ndiaye et Waly Ndiaye, Présidents et ministres de la République du Sénégal, 2000, p. 208.

External links 
 « Décès de Cheikh Hamidou Kane Mathiara : L'ancien commis de l'État n'est plus » (Obituary by Daouda Mane in Le Soleil, 16 May 2009
 « Cheikh Hamidou Kane Mathiara, ancien ministre socialiste, n'est plus » (Obituary on Seneweb News, 16 May 2009)
 « Cheikh Hamidou Kane ‘Mathiara’ n’est plus » (Obituary by Amadou Issa Kane on Wal Fadjri, 16 May 2009)

Senegalese economists
Socialist Party of Senegal politicians
Alliance of the Forces of Progress (Senegal) politicians
Trade ministers of Senegal
Defense ministers of Senegal
Industry ministers of Senegal
Water ministers of Senegal
Military of Senegal
1939 births
2009 deaths